The directors of Roscosmos are the highest-ranked officials of Roscosmos, the space agency of the Russian Federation. The director serves as the senior space science adviser to the President of Russia.

The deputy director of Roscosmos serves as the agency's second in command and is responsible to the administrator for providing overall leadership, planning, and policy direction for the agency. They represent Roscosmos to the Presidential Administration, State Duma, heads of federal and other appropriate government agencies, international organizations, and external organizations and communities. They also oversee the day-to-day work of Roscosmos’ functional offices.

The first director was Yuri Koptev; during his term the agency suffers from financial crisis, and he was who led the Private flights to space, and was also the longest-running director, who held the post from 1992 to 1999.

The current director is Yuriy Borisov, was appointed by President Vladimir Putin on July 15, 2022.

Directors

See also 
List of Administrators and Deputy Administrators of NASA

References

External links 
 Roscosmos

Roscosmos